The men's marathon at the 1954 European Athletics Championships was held in Bern, Switzerland, on 25 August 1954.

Medalists

Results

Final
25 August

Participation
According to an unofficial count, 22 athletes from 15 countries participated in the event.

 (1)
 (1)
 (1)
 (2)
 (1)
 (1)
 (1)
 (2)
 (1)
 (2)
 (2)
 (2)
 (2)
 (2)
 (1)

References

Marathon
Marathons at the European Athletics Championships
Euro
1954 European Athletics
Men's marathons